Shirahatti  is a panchayat town in Gadag district in the Indian state of Karnataka.

Geography
It has an average elevation of 659 metres (2162 feet).

Demographics
 India census, Shirahatti had a population of 16,208. Males constitute 51% of the population and females 49%. Shirahatti has an average literacy rate of 60%, higher than the national average of 59.5%: male literacy is 69%, and female literacy is 50%. 13% of the population is under 6 years of age.

Places to visit 
Shri Jagadguru Fakireshwar Math (Temple) is a famous religious center. Both Hindus and Muslims follow this deity.

Transport
Shirahatti has a dedicated road service to the neighboring districts and towns, the nearest large town being Gadag.  Bus services are available to Hubli, Lakshmeshwara, Mundargi, Ron, on a very regular basis.  Bus services are also available to Bangalore 
regularly.  No train services are available, but the nearest railway station is Lakshameshwar (Yelavigi).

References

Cities and towns in Gadag district